{{DISPLAYTITLE:NZR OC class}}

The OC class, built by the Baldwin Locomotive Works for the Wellington and Manawatu Railway (WMR) in New Zealand, consists of a solitary steam locomotive. Ordered in 1896 as an externally similar but more powerful version of the OA class locomotive ordered in 1894, it entered service in June 1897 as No. 16. It was a Vauclain compound locomotive.

In 1908, the WMR and its locomotive fleet was purchased by the New Zealand Railways Department (NZR) and incorporated into the national rail network, and although No. 16 bore a likeness to members of the O class, it was sufficiently different that it warranted separate classification.  Technical differences were sufficient that it was not classified with the visually similar WMR No. 13/NZR OA 457, and it became OC 458. It is known to have operated on the line from the Hutt Valley through the Rimutaka Range to the western end of the Rimutaka Incline, and its final depot was at Cross Creek at the eastern end of the Rimutaka Incline in the Wairarapa. It was withdrawn from service in July 1930.

External links
Drawing of an OA/OC class locomotive from Derek Brown

References

Bibliography 

 
 
 

Oc class
2-8-0 locomotives
Baldwin locomotives
Vauclain compound locomotives
Scrapped locomotives
Railway locomotives introduced in 1896